Compton Terrace was a name given to two former outdoor amphitheaters for concerts, located in the Phoenix metropolitan area of Arizona. It was named in honor of a local radio personality and music promoter, William Edward Compton.

History
The first Compton Terrace was located on the grounds of Legend City in Tempe, from 1979 until its closing and demolition in 1983. It was owned by Jess Nicks, the father of musician and singer Stevie Nicks.

Compton Terrace at Firebird Lake 
A second location named Compton Terrace amphitheater opened in Chandler in 1985 (located next to the Firebird International Raceway at ). The venue's capacity was approximately 20,000. This site hosted its last event with the Big Top "Electronic Highway Tour" on August 16, 1997. It was demolished in 2010.

Past performers
Notable past performers include U2, The Police, Metallica, Def Leppard, Morrissey, Eurythmics, Fleetwood Mac, Aerosmith, AC/DC, Phil Collins, Grateful Dead, Guns N' Roses, Queen, Iron Maiden, Pat Benatar, Scorpions, Molly Hatchet, Van Halen, Phish, Jane's Addiction, the New Kids On The Block, Living Colour, Nine Inch Nails, Talking Heads, Depeche Mode, The Cure, The Power Station, Orchestral Manoeuvres in the Dark, Rage Against the Machine
 and Bon Jovi.

References

Amphitheaters in the United States
Music venues in Arizona
Buildings and structures in Phoenix, Arizona
Demolished buildings and structures in Arizona
Demolished music venues in the United States
Buildings and structures demolished in 2010
Buildings and structures completed in 1979
1979 establishments in Arizona
Buildings and structures in Chandler, Arizona
History of Phoenix, Arizona